Mirokabad (also Romanized as Mīrokābād; also known as Mīrūkābād) is a village in Khvormiz Rural District, in the Central District of Mehriz County, Yazd Province, Iran. At the 2006 census, its population was 571, in 170 families.

References 

Populated places in Mehriz County